Robin Moffitt (born 15 March 1946) is an Australian judoka. He competed in the men's lightweight event at the 1972 Summer Olympics.

References

External links
 

1946 births
Living people
Australian male judoka
Olympic judoka of Australia
Judoka at the 1972 Summer Olympics
Place of birth missing (living people)